Romance is a 1983 Indian Bollywood film produced and directed by Ramanand Sagar. It stars Kumar Gaurav and Poonam Dhillon in pivotal roles.

Romance (1983) is a colourful, lively story of two teenage lovers of the jet age; Sonia, a half-English girl, and Amar an Indian youth, whose romance blossoms across thousands of miles and crosses all barriers.

Plot
British based Mr. and Mrs. Roy are thrilled when their son announces that he is going to marry a Caucasian woman. Soon they are blessed when a daughter, Sonia, is born. Tragically, their son passes away, leaving them heartbroken.

Sonia grows up under her mother's strict control and guidance, and the love of her grandparents, who encourage her to visit India, which she does. When she returns, she announces that she has met her soul-mate in Amar, who she is going to invite to Britain, where they will marry.

Her mother does not approve of this, as she wants Sonia to marry the Caucasian male of her choice, and will not permit any interference from her in-laws, who are asked to leave her house. In the meantime Amar's passport and money are stolen. He manages to board a ship bound for Britain, where he is subsequently apprehended, arrested and turned over for prosecution and possible deportation as an illegal immigrant. It looks like Sonia's mother will have her way with her daughter after all.

Cast
 Kumar Gaurav as Amar
 Poonam Dhillon as Sonia
 Shammi Kapoor as Mr. Roy
 Sushma Seth as Mrs. Roy
 Saeed Jaffrey as Journalist / Editor
 Prema Narayan as Journalist / Editor's Wife
 Helena Luke as Sonia's Mother
 Tom Alter as Priest
 Viju Khote as Thief
 Raj Babbar as Guest Appearance
 Ranjeeta as Guest Appearance

Soundtrack
Lyrics: Anand Bakshi

References

External links

 Cult of Kumar

1980s Hindi-language films
1983 films
Films scored by R. D. Burman